Emmanuel Mwamba (born 18 April 1971) is a Zambian diplomat. He was born on 18 April 1971 in Luanshya, Zambia where he attended Roan Antelope Secondary. He went on to attended Evelyn Hone College where he obtained a Diploma in Journalism and Public Relations.

Emmanuel Mwamba proceeded to study MBA Master in Peace Studies at  Edith Cowan University, Perth, Australia  and at Institute of Peace & Security Studies, Addis Ababa University.

Emmanuel Mwamba has worked at Zambia National Commercial Bank and the Civil Service in the Administrator Office of the Second President of Zambia. Further on he was assigned to government posts as Permanent Secretary-Northern Province, Permanent Secretary, Eastern Province, Permanent Secretary, Western Province, Permanent Secretary,Ministry of Information and Broadcasting Services, Permanent Secretary Cabinet Office.

Emmanuel Mwamba was appointed to be the Zambia's High Commissioner to South Africa and his last placement was Zambia's Ambassador to Ethiopia, Permanent Representative to the African Union, and Permanent Representative to the United Nations Economic Commission for Africa. He is on the list Zambia Diplomat.

References 

Living people
1971 births
People from Luanshya
Edith Cowan University alumni
Ambassadors of Zambia to Ethiopia
High Commissioners of Zambia
Permanent Representatives of Zambia to the United Nations
Press secretaries